The Taiwan fulvetta (Fulvetta formosana) is a bird species in the family Sylviidae. Like the other typical fulvettas, it was long included in the Timaliidae genus Alcippe. In addition, it was long included in F. cinereiceps as a subspecies.

This species is endemic to Taiwan.

Footnotes

References
 BirdLife International (BLI) (2008) Taiwan Fulvetta Species Factsheet. Retrieved 2008-JULY-30.

Taiwan fulvetta
Birds of Taiwan
Endemic birds of Taiwan
Taiwan fulvetta